Piano Sonata No. 15 may refer to: 
Piano Sonata No. 15 (Beethoven)
Piano Sonata No. 15 (Mozart)